Tara A. Durant (born October 26, 1972) is an American politician who is a member of the Virginia House of Delegates from the 28th district. Elected in November 2021, she assumed office on January 12, 2022.

Early life and education 
Durant was born in Des Moines, Iowa in 1972. She earned a Bachelor of Arts degree in communications and political science from Coe College and attended the University of Baltimore School of Law.

Career 
Outside of politics, Durant has worked as an educator in Iowa and Virginia. She was a teacher at the Holy Cross Academy in Stafford County from 2017 to 2021 and works as a librarian at the school. She was elected to the Virginia House of Delegates in November 2021, defeating incumbent Democrat Joshua G. Cole. She assumed  office on January 12, 2022.

References 

1972 births
Living people
Politicians from Des Moines, Iowa
Coe College alumni
People from Stafford County, Virginia
Republican Party members of the Virginia House of Delegates
Women state legislators in Virginia
21st-century American politicians
21st-century American women politicians
Schoolteachers from Virginia
21st-century American educators
21st-century American women educators